The British Columbia Transmission Corporation (BCTC) was a Crown corporation in the province of British Columbia, Canada.
Its mandate was to plan, build, operate and maintain B.C.'s electricity transmission system.

History and background 
The British Columbia Transmission Corporation (BCTC) was a provincial Crown corporation located in downtown Vancouver regulated by the BC Utilities Commission (BCUC). BCTC was formed in 2003 as a mandate to separate the province's power transmission and generation initiatives but was integrated back into its sister company BC Hydro on 5 July 2010 as part of the province's Clean Energy Act. BCTC was formed to operate the transmission system, while BC Hydro remained the owner of the transmission system.

BCTC was formed in 2003 as the BC Liberal Party's mandate to separate the province's power transmission from BC Hydro. The creation of a separate corporation and the split cost taxpayers an estimated 65 million dollars. Seven years after the separation from BC Hydro, BCTC was integrated back into BC Hydro on 5 July 2010 as part of the province's New Clean Energy Act.

Michael Costello was the first BCTC CEO from 2003-2005. Jane Peverett was BCTC's president and CEO from 2005-2009. Jane Peverett had been at Imperial Oil from 1981-1987 before transferring to a natural gas utility in Toronto. The company was eventually bought by West Coast Energy. When West Coast was bought by Duke Energy in 2002, Jane played a key role in the transition. One year later, she accepted the CFO role at the newly created Vancouver company, BCTC. Janet Woodruff was BCTC's interim CEO from 2009–2010.

When BCTC was formed, the North American electricity industry was hoping to attain increased independence of transmission, and the development of regional transmission organizations. Since then, regional transmission organizations did not develop in the Pacific Northwest, and the movement towards greater independence for transmission was halted. BCTC's publicly owned transmission infrastructure was created to help foster and encourage new sources of power generation across the province of BC. Which was one of the goals of the Province's 2002 Energy Plan.

In February 2007, the B.C. government issued a new Energy Plan. This plan included several policies relating to transmission to ensure adequate transmission be in place to support the province's goal of energy self-sufficiency as well as ensuring BC would have mandatory reliability standards for energy generation.

2010 BC Clean Energy Act 
The Act sets out very specific provisions for British Columbia to become a leading supplier of clean, renewable energy. The Act also establishes a number of measures that is supposed to help meet future electricity needs while generating new jobs and reducing greenhouse gas emissions.

BC's 2010 Clean Energy Act does not change BCTC's roles and responsibilities including planning, building, operating, and maintaining the province's publicly owned electrical transmission system.  It also means that BC Hydro will continue to be publicly owned, with the government as its shareholder and public ownership of heritage assets protected by legislation.
 
This decision was made because the integration of BC Hydro and BCTC into one organization was an important component of the government's clean energy initiative. Unifying BC Hydro and BCTC provides a single point of planning and authority for the provinces energy system.

Operations 
BCTC managed over 300 substations and 18,000 km of transmission lines throughout the province of British Columbia and had over 350 employees, and was located in the Bentall Building of Downtown Vancouver with assets of over 2.5 billion.

Its transmission system was built between 1940 and 1980, and maintains over 60 generating facilities in British Columbia. Energy is generated by hydroelectric generating stations that are owned and operated by BC Hydro. 
Seventy percent of BC's power supply is provided by large reservoirs, and generating stations from the Peace and Columbia regions of British Columbia.

Power is delivered throughout the province through high-voltage lines from its generation facilities to the local substations located throughout the mainland and Vancouver Island facilities where it is distributed and transmitted to local regional commercial businesses and private homes.
Most of British Columbia's electricity supply comes from facilities in the Interior of BC, while 70 to 80 per cent of demand for electricity is in the Lower Mainland and Vancouver Island.

BCTC manages BC's publicly owned transmission system, which includes transmission towers, high-voltage lines, substations and rights-of-way across the province. The transmission lines, cables and substations move electricity across the province which are monitored and controlled from one main control centre and one backup control centre. While much of this activity is automated through computerized Energy Management Systems, operating staff at the control centres work around the clock to respond to varying external conditions or system disturbances and ensure high levels of safety and reliability.  The control centre is a state-of-the-art facility which connects 31 independent power projects and more than 830 MW since 2003.

Awards 
BCTC and Hydro-Québec's LineScout partnership earned the highest award in the Energy Industry – the 2010 Edison Award in the International Affiliate Category.  The Edison Electric Institute's Edison Award, considered one of the industry's highest honors, recognizes distinguished leadership, innovation and contribution to the advancement of the electric industry. The official announcement of the Edison Award is announced and presented at EEI's Annual Convention in June.

BCTC and Hydro-Québec won the Edison Award for the two utilities' partnership in developing the LineScout Robotics Technology for the inspection of transmission water crossings in British Columbia and demonstrates a step forward in innovative inspection methods, high voltage line robotics and employee safety for the energy industry.

LineScout Technology 
LineScout Technology (LST), is a robotic device that inspects high-voltage transmission lines across long passages to improve reliability, inspection, and safety. Hydro-Québec Research Institute, IREQ, worked extensively with BCTC to implement LST on BCTC's large water crossing transmission lines which were built more than 30 years ago. 
The remote-controlled robot uses cameras to inspect line conditions and discover irregularities, while also employing a smart navigation system to pinpoint locations in need of attention. The LST is able to maneuver obstacles such as splices, hardware components and aviation warning markers. Unlike conventional transmission line servicing, the robot can service the lines while they are energized.

LineScout's robotic platform allows it to cross most obstacles on the transmission lines.  Its third generation prototype is validated and tested under field conditions.  LineScout's technology is distinct as it can incorporate robotics into power utilities.  It can also carry a reasonable load, is versatile, and able to adapt to unforeseen obstacles, as well as its teleoperative controls, reliability, and its capacity to add sensors and tools.  Obstacle detection and identification allows the autonomous selection of appropriate strategies for crossing obstacles, as well as the visual inspection of line components found on conductor bundles.

The transmission system

Overview of the transmission system 
The transmission system is part of the Western Interconnection, and extends from BC to Alberta in the north, and northern Mexico in the south, and includes most systems in the western U.S. As required by the Western Electricity Coordinating Council (WECC), the transmission system is planned, built and operated in a manner that avoids negative impact on the interconnected neighboring systems outside BC. Interties to neighboring systems provide opportunities for electricity trade, improves overall reliability of the system, makes backup energy resources available in emergencies, and improves frequency control and power fluctuations.

In BC, the transmission system is divided into three main components – the bulk transmission system, the regional transmission systems and the interties (interconnections).
The internal interties include interties to the Alcan system and the FortisBC system.
The external interties include interties to Alberta and Washington State.
The transmission system also includes a comprehensive communication, protection and control system as part of its components.

Currently, BCTC's operates and maintains:
 18,336 km of transmission lines
 22,000 steel electrical towers 
 100,000 wood electrical poles
 291 switching, distribution and capacitor stations
 One main System Control Centre located in the Lower Mainland
 One back up Control Centre located in the Interior
 169 microwave and fibre optic sites
 Interconnections to Alberta and the Pacific Northwest (USA)
 Four Regional Control Centres

The bulk transmission system includes the 500 kV transmission system, parts of the 230 kV system, the transmission connections to Vancouver Island, and interconnections with other utilities through interties. These lines connect the large remote generating stations in the Peace River and Columbia River areas with the major load centres of the Lower Mainland and Vancouver Island, which together comprise over 70% of the BC Hydro load.

Four regional transmission systems transfer energy within specific geographic areas of the province: the Northern Interior, the Southern Interior, the Lower Mainland, and Vancouver Island.

The regional systems generally consist of 230 kV, 138 kV, and 60 kV transmission networks that connect local generation and deliver power to distribution utilities or transmission customers located within the region.
The transmission system is currently managed by BCTC's System Control Centre (SCC) located in the Lower Mainland, with support from four Regional Control Centres (RCCs). The SCC operates the bulk system, controls intertie flows, and balances the generation supply to meet the real time demand for electrical energy. Control and monitoring activity is automated through a computerized Energy Management System (EMS) and Supervisory Control and Data Acquisition (SCADA) system.
The RCC's are located in Vancouver, Duncan, Vernon and Prince George. Coordination between the SCC and the regional centres ensures that the electric system can operate reliably while meeting customer demands, facilitating electricity trade, and accommodating maintenance outage requirements.  BCTC replaced the current SCC and RCCs with a centralized control centre in the fall of 2008. The centralization project, known as the System Control Modernization Project (SCMP), consists of a geographically separate backup facility, to streamline control and operating infrastructure, replace obsolete technology, and to resolve seismic risk issues.

Approximately half of BC Hydro's generation is located in the BC Southern Interior, one of the largest generation regions in BC.

Overview of the Southern Interior system 
BC Hydro's total installed generation capacity connected to the Southern Interior is 5264 MW. Revelstoke and Mica Generating Stations connect directly into the 500 kV system, while Kootenay Canal, Seven Mile and Arrow Lake generating stations are integrated into the 230 kV system. Other hydroelectric generating stations in the southeast are connected to the FortisBC transmission.

Overview of the Interior Lower Mainland System (ILM) 
The ILM grid is composed of eight 500 kV transmission lines. The power transfer from the Interior to the Lower Mainland and Vancouver Island takes place over four of these lines:

(a) 5L81 and 5L82 connect Nicola (NIC) Substation in the South Interior to Ingledow (ING) and Meridian (MDN) substations in the LM
(b) 5L42 connects Kelly Lake (KLY) Substation in the Interior to Cheekye (CKY) Substation
(c) 5L41 connects KLY to Clayburn (CBN) Substation in the LM.

Four additional lines allow for power sharing between the substations:
 
(a) 5L45 connects CKY and MDN substations in the LM
 
(b) 5L44 connects MDN and ING substations in the Lower Mainland.

(c) 5L40 connects CBN an ING substations in the LM

(d) 5L87 connects NIC and KLY substations in the Interior

The Vancouver Island regional system 
The Vancouver Island regional system is a network of 230 kV, 138 kV, and 60 kV systems. 
The Vancouver Island system has three areas:
(a) North Vancouver Island where most of the island generation is located.
(b) Vancouver Island serving most of the industrial load and the west coast loads of Port Alberni and Long Beach.
(c) Southern Vancouver Island which is mainly residential and commercial.

About 22 percent of the Vancouver Island load is in the North, 46 percent is in the Central, and 32 percent is in the Southern Vancouver Island area.

In the area west of Victoria the three substations:  Colwood, Sooke and Jordan River Generating Station are radially connected by a 138 kV circuit.  The Jordan River Generating Station has a maximum output of 170 MVA. If an outage occurs between the areas of Colwood and Sooke, the generating station at Jordan River would be able to supply the combined demands for Colwood, Sooke, and Jordan River regions.

See also
BC Hydro
Powerex Corp a wholly owned subsidiary of BC Hydro
List of electrical generating stations in British Columbia

Notes

References
 https://www.bcndp.ca/newsroom/bctc-merger-bc-hydro-latest-proof-bc-liberals%E2%80%99-energy-policy-failure-says-ndp
 http://greenpolicyprof.org/wordpress/?p=427
 https://web.archive.org/web/20100804065315/http://www2.news.gov.bc.ca/news_releases_2009-2013/2010PREM0090-000483.htm
 The Inquiry, summer 2006 Jane Peverett by Christine Ward.
 http://www.bctransmission2040.ca/about
 http://tdworld.com/customer_service/eei-edison-awards-0610/
 https://web.archive.org/web/20110710180332/http://www.electricity-today.com/download/issue4_2007.pdf
 https://web.archive.org/web/20110707215607/http://transmission.bchydro.com/NR/rdonlyres/2F4295AB-5F56-49E3-B194-131CEE9977E8/0/STSRDecember07.pdf

External links
BC Transmission Corporation Official Site

Former Crown corporations of Canada
Electric power transmission system operators in Canada
Defunct electric power companies of Canada
Electric power transmission systems in Canada
BC Hydro
2003 establishments in British Columbia
2010 disestablishments in British Columbia